The Hermitage is a locality in the Southern Downs Region, Queensland, Australia.

History 
The locality was named and bounded  on 14 September 2001.

Amenities 
The Hermitage-Yangan branch of the Queensland Country Women's Association has its rooms at 589 Warwick Yangan Road.

Education 
There are no schools in The Hermitage; the nearest schools are in Warwick.

References 

Southern Downs Region
Localities in Queensland